The following is a list of notable deaths in January 1966.

Entries for each day are listed alphabetically by surname. A typical entry lists information in the following sequence:
 Name, age, country of citizenship at birth, subsequent country of citizenship (if applicable), reason for notability, cause of death (if known), and reference.

January 1966

1 
 Vincent Auriol, President of France (b. 1884)
 Oscar Dugey, American baseball player (b. 1887)
 George Featherston, Australian rules footballer (b. 1889) 
 Friedrich Wilhelm Levi, German mathematician (b. 1888)

2 
 Haps Benfer, American football and basketball player and coach (b. 1893)
 Jan Gadomski, Polish astronomer (b. 1889)
 Fidel Luña, Mexican fencer, competed at the 1948 Summer Olympics

3 
 Haidar Abashidze, Georgian politician, journalist, and educator (b. 1893)
 Luther Bonin, American baseball player (b. 1888) 
 Henry James Forman, American writer (b. 1879) 
 Bill Hickey, Australian rules footballer (b. 1881)
 Marguerite Higgins, Hong Kong-born American journalist (b. 1920)
 Rex Lease, American actor (b. 1903)

4 
 Inga Artamonova, Soviet speed skater (b. 1936)
 Marshall Caffyn, Australian rules footballer (b. 1892)
 Arthur Charlesworth, English footballer (b. 1898)
 Cecil Copping, American composer (b. 1888)
 John F. Dittbrender, American politician, Member of the Wisconsin State Assembly (b. 1878)
 Guido Fiorini, Italian art director (b. 1897)
 Seiko Fujita, Japanese martial artist (b. 1898)
 Orson Kinney, American basketball player and coach (b. 1894)
 E. E. Kurth, Australian geologist (b. 1895)
 Eric Ralph Lingeman, British diplomat, ambassador to Afghanistan and to Uruguay (b. 1898)
 Gordon McLennan, Australian rugby player (b. 1915)

5 
 Mirashi Buwa, Indian classical singer (b. 1883)
 Richard C. Dillon, American politician, Governor of New Mexico (b. 1877)
 George Duckworth, English cricketer (b. 1901)

6 
 Albrecht Brandi, German U-boat commander in World War II (b. 1914)
 Harmar D. Denny, Jr., American politician, member of the U.S. House of Representatives from Pennsylvania (b. 1886)
 James Lawrence Fly, American lawyer, Chairman of the Federal Communications Commission (b. 1898)
 Carl Gerard, Danish-born American actor (b. 1885)
 Anna Gréki, Algerian writer (b. 1931)
 Louis Henry Hantelman, American-born Canadian politician, member of the Legislative Assembly of Saskatchewan (b. 1884)
 Jean Lurçat, French artist (b. 1892)

7 
 Ernest Bernau, New Zealand cricketer (b. 1896)
 Allan Chapman, Scottish politician, MP (b. 1897)
 William Jeffrey, Scottish-born American soccer coach (b. 1892)
 James J. Lyons, American politician, Borough President of the Bronx (b. 1890)

8 
 Marthe Cnockaert, Belgian spy during World War I (b. 1892)
 Noah Greenberg, American choral conductor (b. 1919)

9 
 Eusebio Rodolfo Cordón Cea, provisional president of El Salvador (b. 1899)
 Friedrich Wilhelm Foerster, German-French-American philosopher (b. 1869)
 Wilfred Hanbury, Canadian politician, member of the House of Commons of Canada (b. 1887)
 Vladas Jurgutis, Lithuanian banker, first chairman of the Bank of Lithuania (b. 1885)

10 
 Fen Cresswell, New Zealand cricketer (b. 1915)
 Vernon Dahmer, American civil rights leader (b. 1908)
Hermann Kasack, German writer (b. 1896).
 Nishizō Tsukahara, Japanese admiral (b. 1887)

11 
 Joseph William Comeau, Canadian politician, member of the Senate of Canada (b. 1876)
 Robin de la Condamine, English actor (b. 1877) 
 Alberto Giacometti, Swiss sculptor (b. 1901)
 Maurice Hill, British geophysicist (b. 1919)
 Hannes Kolehmainen, Finnish runner (b. 1889)
 Lal Bahadur Shastri, Prime Minister of India (b. 1904)

12 
 Norman Emerson, Irish Anglican priest and author (b. 1900)
 Narhar Vishnu Gadgil, Indian politician, Minister of Public Works (b. 1896)

13 
 Johan Arnd Aasgaard, American Lutheran church leader (b. 1876)
 Leopoldo Baracco, Italian politician, member of Constituent Assembly of Italy and of the Chamber of Deputies (b. 1886)
 Flora Jean Cameron, New Zealand nurse (b. 1902)
 Hans Edvard Kjølseth, Norwegian politician, MP (b. 1870)
 Albert Langereis, Dutch sports shooter, competed at the 1924 Summer Olympics (b. 1888)
 John Lees-Jones, British politician, MP (b. 1887)

14 
 Curt Backeberg, German horticulturist (b. 1894)
 Beatrice Mary Barth, New Zealand piano teacher (b. 1877)
 Bill Carr, American athlete, Olympic gold medalist in 1932 (b. 1909)
 Lella Secor Florence, American writer and activist (b. 1887)
 Sergei Korolev, Soviet rocket engineer, chief designer during the Space Race (b. 1907)
 K. S. Venkatakrishna Reddiar, Indian politician (b. 1909)

15 
 Samuel Akintola, Nigerian premier of the Western region and Aare Ona Kakanfo XIII of the Yoruba (b. 1910)
 Charles Elliot Allen, Irish rugby union forward (b. 1880)
 Sir Ahmadu Bello, Nigerian politician, first premier of the Northern Nigeria region (b. 1910)
 Birger Braadland, Norwegian politician, Minister of Foreign Affairs (b. 1879)
 Stiles O. Clements, American architect (b. 1883)
 Heinrich Keimig, German handball player, gold medalist at the 1936 Summer Olympics (b. 1913)
 Sergei Korolev, Russian space scientist (b. 1907)

16 
 Raynold E. Acre, American aviation pioneer (b. 1889)
 Nikolai Bernstein, Soviet neurophysiologist (b. 1896)
 Johnny Broderick, American police detective in New York City (b. 1896) 
 Bobby Burns, American actor and director (b. 1878) 
 Archibald Bush, American businessman (b. 1887)
 Gen. Courtney Hodges, American general during World War II (b. 1887)

17 
 Percival Barnett, English cricketer (b. 1889)
 Edward Craigie, Australian politician, member of the South Australian House of Assembly (b. 1871)
 Vincent J. Donehue, American stage director (b. 1917)
 Georges Figon, French secret agent
 Otto Flügel, German submariner (b. 1917)
 Ivo Krbek, Croatian politician, Mayor of Zagreb (b. 1890)

18 
 Hyacinthe-Adélard Fortier, Canadian politician, member of the Canadian House of Commons (b. 1875)
 Kathleen Norris, American writer (b. 1880)

19 
 Henry Ah Kew, New Zealand lawyer and community leader (b. 1900)
 Violet Bathurst, Lady Apsley, British Conservative Party politician, MP (b. 1895)
 James Carmichael, British politician, MP (b. 1894)
 Édouard Paul Dhorme, French Semitologist (b. 1881)
 Frank Foyston, Canadian ice hockey player (b. 1891)
 Ada Cherry Kearton, South African singer (b. 1877)
 Ruth Landshoff, German-American actress (b. 1904)

20 
 Bill Anderton, New Zealand Labour Party politician (b. 1891)
 George Devine, English theatrical producer, manager, actor (b. 1910)
 Victor Cicero Kays, American academic, president of Arkansas State University (b. 1882)
 Gordon Macdonald, 1st Baron Macdonald of Gwaenysgor, British politician, MP, last British governor of the Dominion of Newfoundland (b. 1888)

21 
 Pol Abraham, French architect (b. 1891)
 Robert Beasley, British cricketer (b. 1882)
 Sir Richard Layton Butler, Australian politician, Premier of South Australia (b. 1885)
 Paul Comtois, Canadian politician, Lieutenant Governor of Quebec (b. 1895)
 William Davies, Welsh footballer (b. 1882)
 Mary Teresa Enright, New Zealand educator (b. 1880)
 K. T. Keller, American businessman, president of Chrysler (b. 1885)
 Murray Macgregor, Scottish geologist (b. 1884)

22 
 Cyril Dugmore, British athlete, competed at the 1908 Summer Olympics (b. 1882)
 Jean Galtier-Boissière, French writer (b. 1891)
 Morris Gray, Russian-born Canadian politician, member of the Manitoba Legislature (b. 1889)
 Leo Krzycki, American politician, chairman of the Socialist Party of America (b. 1881) 
 Herbert Marshall, English actor (b. 1890)

23 
 Jo van Ammers-Küller, Dutch writer (b. 1884)
 Frank L. Anders, United States Army soldier, received Medal of Honor (b. 1875)
 Berton Braley, American poet (b. 1882)
 Pat Cannon, American politician, United States Representative from Florida (b. 1904)
 Martin Conlon, Irish politician, TD (b. 1879)

24 
 Homi J. Bhabha, Indian nuclear physicist, known as "father of the Indian nuclear programme" (b. 1909)
 David Brynmor Anthony, Welsh academic administrator (b. 1886)
 Arvid G. Hansen, Norwegian journalist and politician (b. 1894)
 Ernesto Igel, Austrian-Brazilian businessman (b. 1893)

25 
 Saul Adler FRS, Russian-born British-Israeli expert on parasitology (b. 1895)
 Edmund Blaurock, German Army general during World War II (b. 1899)
 Miguel Bover, Spanish bicycle racer (b. 1928)
 Alfred Cliff, English cricketer (b. 1878)
 Bradshaw Crandell, American artist (b. 1896)
 Margaret Graham, Australian broadcaster (b. 1889)
 Alexander Ireland, Scottish wrestler and boxer, silver medalist at the 1920 Summer Olympics (b. 1901)

26 
 Robert Corkey, Northern Ireland politician and Presbyterian minister (b. 1881)
 Stanton Crawford, American academic, Chancellor of the University of Pittsburgh (b. 1897)
 William Carey Graves, American politician, member of the Texas State Senate (b. 1895)
 Frederick Hawkes, English Anglican Bishop of Kingston (b. 1878)

27 
 Caterina Albert, Spanish writer (b. 1869)
 Major Ronald Armstrong-Jones, British barrister and soldier; father-in-law of Princess Margaret (b. 1899)
 Grover Cleveland Bergdoll, American pilot who went to Germany to avoid service in World War I (b. 1893)
 Norman Blackburn, English World War I pilot and aviation industrialist (b. 1896)
 Henry Carlton Cumberbatch, British Royal Navy officer during World War II (b. 1900)
 Ludwig Gies, German sculptor (b. 1887)

28 
 Benjamin Burrows, English composer (b. 1891) 
 Edward J. Hickox, American basketball coach (b. 1878)
 Olaf H. Johnson, American politician, member of the Wisconsin State Senate (b. 1892)
 Victims of Lufthansa Flight 005:
 Bruno Bianchi, Italian swimmer, competitor at 1960 and 1964 Olympic Games (b. 1943)
 Paolo Costoli, Italian swimmer, competed at 1928 Olympics and 1932 Olympics (b. 1910)
 Sergio De Gregorio, Italian swimmer, competed at the 1964 Summer Olympics (b. 1946)
 Dino Rora, Italian swimmer, competed at the 1964 Summer Olympics (b. 1945)

29 
 Sir George Barstow KCB, British civil servant and businessman (b. 1874)
 Robert Elias Fries, Swedish botanist (b. 1876)

30 
 Erik Bergström, Swedish footballer, Olympic competitor in 1908 and 1912 (b. 1886)
 Florence St John Cadell, Scottish artist (b. 1877)
 Harry Curtis, English footballer and manager (b. 1890)
 Charlie Foletta, Australian rules footballer (b. 1875)
 Nestor Hammarlund, Swedish politician (b. 1888)
 Jaan Hargel, Estonian musician (b. 1912)
 Rudolf Löb, German banker (b. 1877)
 Al Maginnes, American football player (b. 1897)

31 
 Karl Björkänge, Swedish politician, member of parliament (b. 1895)
 Dirk Brouwer, Dutch-American astronomer (b. 1902)
 Manishi Dey, Indian painter (b. 1909)
 Pat Donahue, American baseball player (b. 1884)
 George Goulding, English-born Canadian athlete, gold medalist at 1912 Summer Olympics (b. 1884)
 Edgar King, New Zealand-born Australian surgeon and pathologist (b. 1900)
 Frej Liewendahl, Finnish distance runner, gold medalist at the 1924 Summer Olympics (b. 1902)
 Elizabeth Patterson, American actress (b. 1875)
 Arthur Percival, British general (b.1887)

References

1966-01
January 1966 events